Whiskey Run is a stream in Beaver Township, Noble County of Ohio.  It flows along Whiskey Run Road east of Batesville.

In the 19th century, several distilleries were built along Whiskey Run, hence the name.

See also
List of rivers of Ohio

References

Rivers of Noble County, Ohio
Rivers of Ohio